Suhl is a river of Hesse and Thuringia, Germany. It flows into the Weihe near Berka/Werra.

See also
List of rivers of Hesse
List of rivers of Thuringia

References

Rivers of Hesse
Rivers of Thuringia
Rivers of Germany